The 2016–17 Drake Bulldogs women's basketball team represents Drake University during the 2016–17 NCAA Division I women's basketball season. The Bulldogs, led by fifth year head coach Jennie Baranczyk, played their home games at Knapp Center and were members of the Missouri Valley Conference. They finished the season 28–5, 18–0 in MVC play to win the MVC regular season championship. They defeated Illinois State, Wichita State and Northern Iowa to become champions of the Missouri Valley women's tournament and earn an automatic trip to the NCAA women's tournament for the first time since 2007, where they defeated by Kansas State in the first round.

Season

Roster

Schedule

|-
!colspan=9 style="background:#004477; color:#FFFFFF;"| Exhibition

|-
!colspan=9 style="background:#004477; color:#FFFFFF;"| Non-conference regular season

|-
!colspan=9 style="background:#004477; color:#FFFFFF;"| Missouri Valley Conference regular season

|-
!colspan=9 style="background:#004477; color:#FFFFFF;"| Missouri Valley Women's Tournament

|-
!colspan=9 style="background:#004477; color:#FFFFFF;"| NCAA tournament

Rankings

See also
2016–17 Drake Bulldogs men's basketball team

References

Drake Bulldogs women's basketball seasons
Drake
Drake